The Evolutionary Classification of Protein Domains (ECOD) is a biological database that classifies protein domains available from the Protein Data Bank. The ECOD tries to determine the evolutionary relationships between proteins.

Similar to Pfam, CATH, and SCOP, ECOD compiles domains instead of whole proteins. However, ECOD focuses on evolutionary relationships more heavily: instead of grouping proteins by folds, which may simply represent convergent evolution, ECOD groups proteins by demonstratable homology only.

References 

Protein structure
Protein classification
Biological databases
Protein superfamilies